The Space Shuttle Pathfinder (unofficial Orbiter Vehicle Designation: OV-098) is a Space Shuttle test simulator made of steel and wood. Constructed by NASA in 1977 as an unnamed facilities test article, it was purchased in the early 1980s by the America-Japan Society, Inc. which had it refurbished, named it, and placed it on display in the Great Space Shuttle Exhibition in Tokyo. The mockup was later returned to the United States and placed on permanent display at the U.S. Space & Rocket Center in Huntsville, Alabama, in May 1988.

Activities
Originally unnamed, the simulator was built at the Marshall Space Flight Center in 1977 for use in activities such as checking roadway clearances, crane capabilities and fits within structures. It was later shipped by barge to the Kennedy Space Center and was used for ground crew testing in the Vehicle Assembly Building, Orbiter Processing Facility, and Shuttle Landing Facility. Pathfinder is approximately the same size, shape and weight of an actual orbiter.  Using Pathfinder allowed for facilities testing without requiring use of the more delicate and expensive Enterprise.

Refurbishment

After sitting in storage for many years, the America-Japan Society, Inc. obtained the wood and steel mockup at a cost of US$1 million and hired Teledyne Brown Engineering to refurbish it to more closely resemble an actual Space Shuttle. It was named Pathfinder and displayed at the Great Space Shuttle Exposition in Tokyo from June 1983 to August 1984.

U.S. Space & Rocket Center

After the exhibit, Pathfinder returned to the United States.  The U.S. Space & Rocket Center in Huntsville, Alabama designed the display and built a stand.  NASA provided MPTA-ET and two filament-wound Solid Rocket Booster casings, which had been designed for polar-orbit launches from Vandenberg Air Force Base.

On February 16, 1988, NASA shipped MPTA-ET, an external tank which had been used for propulsion tests with MPTA-098, on an open barge from Stennis Space Center in Mississippi up the river to Michoud, where it was transferred to the Orion barge to sail up the river to Marshall Space Flight Center.  The tank, not having been designed to hold the weight of an orbiter at an angle, required reinforcements.  NASA installed I-beam spokes in the tank at Marshall, in building 4705. Pathfinders weight is concentrated in the tail, though, and the tank required further reinforcements.  The tank was then transported over land to the display at the museum.

In May 1988, the 89-ton Pathfinder was installed atop the display at the Space & Rocket Center.

In 1999, NASA removed the forward assemblies from each SRB attached to the Pathfinder stack.  Although the SRBs are recovered and reused after each flight, several of the forward assemblies had been damaged or lost over the history of the Space Shuttle program necessitating requisition of those attached to the Pathfinder stack as spares.

In 2008, repairs were made to the forward part of the mockup after decades of exposure to the weather had corroded the floor section near the vehicle's nose. This corrosion caused the "belly pan" to drop from a mounting bracket onto the external tank. The damaged area was part of the fiberglass and plywood added to the mockup before its exhibition in Japan.

In 2020 the Center received a "Save America's Treasures" grant for $500,000 from the National Park Service. The project began with the wings and tail section temporarily removed between January and February 2021. On February 8, the Pathfinder was lowered from its mounting points atop the fuel tank for the first time since May 5, 1988. The restoration project is proceeding alongside cooperation with the Marshall Space Flight Center, who will assist in assessing the structural integrity of the test shuttle.

See also
 Space Shuttle America, a tourist attraction
 Space Shuttle Independence, a full-scale made from blueprints public awareness display mockup
 Space Shuttle Inspiration, a pre-finalization engineering mockup

References

External links 

 Orbiter Vehicles 
 Shuttle Test Article Pathfinder 

Replica spacecraft
Space Shuttle tourist attractions
U.S. Space & Rocket Center